Local elections were held in Iba, Zambales, on May 13, 2013, within the Philippine general election. The voters elected local posts in the city: the mayor, vice mayor, and eight councilors.

Results
The candidates for mayor and vice mayor with the highest number of votes wins the seat; they are voted separately, therefore, they may be of different parties when elected.

References

2013 Philippine local elections
Elections in Iba